The Indian Rheumatology Association (IRA)is a professional organization of rheumatologists and related professionals in India. Its annual meetings called IRACON and are generally held in Fall during November or early December. Besides the national conference, IRA organises regional CMEs and zonal conferences for promoting Rheumatology education and awareness among medical professionals.

Journal
The association publishes the quarterly peer reviewed  medical journal, Indian Journal of Rheumatology.

References

External links

Rheumatology organizations